Queen of Pop is a nickname most commonly associated with American singer Madonna. 

Queen of Pop may also refer to:
 Several other musicians, see honorific nicknames in popular music
 Queen of Pop (album), a 2000 album by Marcia Hines
 "Queen of Pop", an annual award given out at the Australian pop music awards

See also
 Queen of Hip-Pop, a 2005 album by Namie Amuro
 Queen of Soul (disambiguation)